Kissing Is No Sin (German: Küssen ist keine Sünd) is a 1950 Austrian-German comedy film directed by Hubert Marischka and starring Curd Jürgens, Hans Olden and Hans Moser. The film takes its title from the waltz "Küssen ist keine Sünd" in Edmund Eysler's 1903 operetta Bruder Straubinger and features the song in its soundtrack.

It was shot at the Bavaria Studios in Munich and on location in Salzburg. The film's sets were designed by the art director Hans Ledersteger and Ernst Richter.

Cast
 Curd Jürgens as Kammersänger, Felix Alberti 
 Hans Olden as Ferdinand Schwaighofer, sein Impresario 
 Hans Moser as Alois Eder, Gastwirt zur 'Goldenen Gans' 
 Erika von Thellmann as Anastasia, seine Frau 
 Elfie Mayerhofer as Tilly, deren Tochter 
 Adolf Gondrell as Generaldirektor Steinberger 
 Gisela Fackeldey as Mara, seine Freundin 
 Hans Leibelt
 Theodor Danegger
 Max Schipper as Leopold, Gastwirt 
 Gertrud Wolle as Hildegard 
 Hélène Robert as Kathi 
 Axel Scholtz as Kellnerjunge, Eduard 
 Rudolf Schündler
 Hugo Gottschlich
 Hans Hais
 Paul Mahr
 Thea Aichbichler
 Richard Bender
 Rita Rechenberg
 Heinz Beck
 Franz Loskarn
 Rolf Pinegger
 Wastl Witt
 Herbert Hübner as Christian Reinecke, Oberlehrer

References

Bibliography 
 Robert von Dassanowsky. Austrian Cinema: A History. McFarland, 2005.

External links 
 

1950 films
1950 musical comedy films
Austrian romantic comedy films
Austrian musical comedy films
German musical comedy films
West German films
1950s German-language films
Films directed by Hubert Marischka
Films based on operettas
Films about singers
Films shot at Bavaria Studios
1950s romantic musical films
Austrian black-and-white films
1950s German films